The Carlin Unconformity or Carlin Trend is a geologic feature in northeastern Nevada which represents a period of erosion or non-deposition likely associated with a collision between a tectonic crustal block called a terrane and the North American Plate. The collision occurred during the Mississippian Period, about 350 million years before present. The collision is associated with the Antler Orogeny.

The collision induced higher crustal temperatures and pressures which produced numerous hot springs along the suture zone. Several episodes of subsurface magmatism are known to have occurred subsequent to the collision, associated with tectonic forces affecting the entire Basin and Range Province. During each of these episodes, and particularly during the Eocene epoch, hot springs brought dissolved minerals toward the surface, precipitating them out along fissures. Among these minerals were gold and silver.

The Carlin Gold trend is one of the world's richest gold mining districts. Gold was first discovered in the area in the 1870s, but there was little production until 1909, and only about 22,000 ounces was produced through 1964. By 2008, mines in the Carlin Trend had produced over 70 million ounces of gold, worth around $85 billion at 2010 prices.

See also
 Carlin–type gold deposit
 Gold mining in Nevada
 John Livermore
 Ralph J. Roberts

References

Further reading

 
 
 
Newmont's reserve history on the Carlin Trend, 1965 - 2001 by Dean G. Heitt, Newmont Mining Corporation

Unconformities
Carboniferous events
Carboniferous geology of Nevada
Gold mining in Nevada